All Japan Grand Touring Car Championship is a grand touring car racing series that began in 1993. It was the top level of sports car racing in Japan.

The series was sanctioned by the Japan Automobile Federation (JAF) and ran by the GT Association (GTA). Autobacs has served as the title sponsor of the series since 1998.

History
The JGTC (Japanese Grand Touring Championship) was established in 1993 by the Japan Automobile Federation (JAF) via its subsidiary company the GTA (GT Association), replacing the defunct All Japan Sports Prototype Championship for Group C cars and the Japanese Touring Car Championship for Group A touring cars, which instead would adopt the supertouring formula. Seeking to prevent the spiraling budgets and one-team/make domination of both series, JGTC imposed strict limits on power, and heavy weight penalties on race winners in an openly stated objective to keep on-track action close with an emphasis on keeping fans happy.

In its first season, the JGTC grid mostly consisted of  cars, with the only genuine JGTC cars being a Nismo-entered Nissan Skyline GT-R and Nissan Silvia S13, of which the GT-R was a modified AWD Group A car. An exception was the first race of the season, which was also an exhibition race of the IMSA GT Championship, and therefore saw a contingent of GTS and GTU cars from the American series join the field. The 1000 km Suzuka also saw a greater variety of competitors, with Group C prototypes, Group N touring cars, and GT cars from Europe and IMSA all joining the field.

For the following season, the series would undergo a rules overhaul, creating a class for the FIA's GT1 category, and another for the GT2 category. The JSS series would altogether dissolve into the latter category. What made the series more significant was that compared to other racing series, JGTC teams at the time had the freedom to enter whichever cars they preferred, even if it was the JSS cars from the inaugural season or spaceframe racers from the IMSA GTS class. However, the Group C prototypes, whilst easily showing dominant form, were banned from the series from the 1995 season onwards.

By the end of the 1995 season, as the cost of obtaining and running a GT1 car had dramatically increased, the JGTC would go through another rules overhaul in order to lower costs and avoid the fate of the JSPC series it had replaced. The newly formed GT500 and GT300 regulations were adopted, which capped cars with air restrictors depending on their weight and power. While the regulations would continuously evolve, the GT500 and GT300 classes continue to form the top level of Japanese sports car racing today.

The cars
The cars are divided into two groups; GT300 and GT500. The names of the categories derive from their traditional maximum horsepower limit - in the early years of the series, GT500 cars would have no more than 500 horsepower, GT300 cars would max out at around 300 hp. However, the current generation of GT500 powerplants produce in excess of 600 horsepower. In the later years of the series the GT300, the horsepower range varies from around 400 to just over 550 horsepower; however, GT300 cars have far less downforce than their GT500 counterparts.

In both groups, the car number is assigned to the team, in which each team is allowed to choose whichever number they want as long as the number isn't already used by any other team. The number assigned to each team is permanent, and may only change hands when the team exits the series. In addition, only defending team champions are allowed to use number 0 (for GT300 champions) and 1 (for GT500 champions), although it isn't mandatory for defending champions to use those numbers.

For easy identification, GT500 cars run white headlight covers, windshield decals, and number panels, while GT300 cars run yellow versions of those items.

GT500

Controversies

1998 JGTC Fuji incident

Japanese driver Tetsuya Ota is notable for surviving a fiery multi-car pileup he was involved in during a JGTC race at Fuji Speedway on May 3, 1998. The accident was initially caused by an oversaturated track. Ota then aquaplaned and left the track which put him directly into an already crashed Porsche. At the time of the accident, the Ferrari Ota was driving had a full cell of fuel which was ignited by the impact. Ota was severely injured due to third-degree burns on a good percentage of his body which may have been prevented if JGTC, at the time, had sufficient emergency response.

Death of Shingo Tachi
Although there are presently no fatalities during a JGTC or Super GT race meeting, Shingo Tachi, the 1998 GT300 champion, was killed during a testing accident in TI Circuit Aida on March 11, 1999. Tachi's GT500 Toyota Supra, belonging to Team LeMans, suffered a technical failure and was unable to slow down for the first corner; Tachi crashed into the tyre wall at unabated speed, suffering massive chest injuries from the steering wheel and was pronounced dead an hour later.

Champions
Masahiko Kageyama and Morio Nitta are tied for the record of most drivers championship won in GT1/GT300 class with three. Masahiko Kageyama was the first driver to win multiple championship as well as the sport's first two-time and three-time champion, all of them won consecutively.

References

External links
Super GT website